The United Nations General Assembly Resolution 500 was approved on May 18, 1951, recommending a trade embargo on the People’s Republic of China and North Korea, in response to the intervention of Chinese troops in Korean War.

Background
In late 1950, hundreds of thousands of Chinese troops crossed into North Korea to help the troops of North Korea to fight the coalition led by United States and South Korea.

On February 1, 1951, the United Nations General Assembly Resolution 498 was passed, condemning the aggression of the People's Republic of China.
This was followed by Report A/1802 of the United Nations General Assembly First Committee, containing the draft resolution which was considered by the General Assembly at its 330th plenary meeting on May 18, 1951; the resolution was passed with 47 votes to nil, with 8 abstentions and 5 nations not voting.

The resolution in summary
The resolution recommended that all nations impose a trade embargo of weapons, ammunition and implements of war, as well as the means of their productions, along with atomic energy materials, petroleum, and transportation of strategic value, to areas under the control of the Central People's Government of the People's Republic of China and of the Government of North Korea.

The voting in detail
For

 Brazil

 Chile

 Philippines

 Yemen

Against

None

Abstentions

 Burma

 Syria

Present Not Voting

''

Aftermath
The trade embargo imposed by the resolution forced the People’s Republic of China to rely on economic assistances from the Eastern Bloc, and later on economic self-sufficiency. Meanwhile, the embargo forced the then-British Colony of Hong Kong to transition its economy, from an entrepôt between China and the West, to an exporter of locally manufactured goods.

After the Korean Armistice Agreement in 1953, nations gradually lifted their trade embargo against the People’s Republic of China; for the United States, the lifting of the embargo was announced by President Richard Nixon in 1971.

See also
United Nations General Assembly resolution
United Nations Security Council resolution

References

United Nations General Assembly resolutions
Korean War
1951 in the United Nations
May 1951 events
Korea and the United Nations
China and the United Nations